Taillades is a commune in the Vaucluse department in the Provence-Alpes-Côte d'Azur region in southeastern France.

Situated in the Luberon, the village covers 675 hectares of which 320 are mountainside. It has a population of about 1,900 inhabitants.

The village was awarded the 'two flowers' standard in the national competition for floral villages.

History
The village developed as a community of stone workers employed at the quarries nearby.  The entrance to the old village is marked by a medieval tower, a vestige of the original castle. The castle was rebuilt in the seventeenth century. In 1859, the village mill, Moulin Saint-Pierre, was built. Today it is used as a function room for the village.

See also
 Côtes du Luberon AOC
Communes of the Vaucluse department
Luberon

References

Communes of Vaucluse